Avdyatovo is a rural locality (a village) in Ostrovsky District, Pskov Oblast, Russia. The population was 3 as of 2010.

Geography 
Avdyatovo is located 22 km north of Ostrov (the district's administrative centre) by road. Asanovshchina is the nearest rural locality.

References 

Rural localities in Pskov Oblast